Laurent Dominati (born 5 August 1960) is a French politician.

Early life
Dominati was born on August 5, 1960 in Paris, France. His father, Jacques Dominati, was a Corsican politician. His brother, Philippe Dominati, is a politician.

Career
Dominati served as a member of the National Assembly from 1993 to 2002, representing Paris.

References

1960 births
Living people
Politicians from Paris
Union for French Democracy politicians
Liberal Democracy (France) politicians
The Republicans (France) politicians
Deputies of the 10th National Assembly of the French Fifth Republic
Deputies of the 11th National Assembly of the French Fifth Republic
Sciences Po alumni
French people of Italian descent
Members of Parliament for Paris